Elections to Aberdeen City Council took place on 5 May 2022 on the same day as the 31 other Scottish local government elections. The election used the 13 wards created following the fifth statutory review of electoral arrangements conducted by Local Government Boundary Commission for Scotland in 2016, with 45 councillors elected. Each ward elected either three or four councillors, using the STV electoral system.

For the second consecutive election, the Scottish National Party (SNP) were returned as the largest party on the council increasing their number by one to 20 councillors. Labour regained some of the ground it had lost at the previous election to overtake the Conservatives into second place with 11 councillors (up two) while the Conservatives lost three seats to return eight councillors. The number of Liberal Democrats (4) and independent candidates (2) elected was unchanged.

Background

Previous election

At the previous election in 2017, the Scottish National Party (SNP) won the most seats on the council for the first time. The SNP gained four seats to hold 19, four shy of an overall majority, while Labour lost eight seats which left them with nine as they fell from the largest party to third place. The Conservatives gained eight seats to record their best result in Aberdeen since 1980 with 11 seats while the Liberal Democrats lost one seat to hold four. Two independent councillors were also elected. As a result, a coalition was formed between Labour, the Conservatives and independent councillors to run the council however, this resulted in the suspension of Labour councillors from the party as the party's executive had not approved the coalition.

Results

Ward summary

|- class="unsortable" align="centre"
!rowspan=2 align="left"|Ward
! % 
!Seats
! %
!Seats
! %
!Seats
! %
!Seats
! %
!Seats
! %
!Seats
!rowspan=2|Total
|- class="unsortable" align="center"
!colspan=2 |SNP
!colspan=2 |Lab
!colspan=2 |Con
!colspan=2 |Lib Dem
!colspan=2 |Ind
!colspan=2 |Others
|-
|align="left"|Dyce/Bucksburn/Danestone
|bgcolor="#efe146"|41.3
|bgcolor="#efe146"|2
|17.8
|1
|26.2
|1
|8.8
|0
|colspan="2" 
|5.9
|0
|4
|-
|align="left"|Bridge of Don
|bgcolor="#efe146"|40.4
|bgcolor="#efe146"|2
|15.3
|1
|29.1
|1
|10.9
|0
|colspan="2" 
|4.4
|0
|4
|-
|align="left"|Kingswells/Sheddocksley/Summerhill
|33.1
|1
|13.6
|1
|12.0
|0
|bgcolor="#ffa500"|37.4
|bgcolor="#ffa500"|1
|colspan="2" 
|3.9
|0
|3
|-
|align="left"|Northfield/Mastrick North
|bgcolor="#efe146"|53.3
|bgcolor="#efe146"|2
|26.3
|1
|10.2
|0
|4.1
|0
|colspan="2" 
|4.2
|0
|3
|-
|align="left"|Hilton/Woodside/Stockethill
|bgcolor="#efe146"|44.4
|bgcolor="#efe146"|2
|24.6
|1
|17.1
|0
|6.3
|0
|colspan="2" 
|7.6
|0
|3
|-
|align="left"|Tillydrone/Seaton/Old Aberdeen
|bgcolor="#efe146"|43.3
|bgcolor="#efe146"|2
|25.7
|1
|13.3
|0
|4.5
|0
|2.9
|0
|9.8
|0
|3
|-
|align="left"|Midstocket/Rosemount
|bgcolor="#efe146"|37.8
|bgcolor="#efe146"|1
|21.5
|1
|24.5
|1
|7.0
|0
|colspan="2" 
|9.3
|0
|3
|-
|align="left"|George Street/Harbour
|bgcolor="#efe146"|42.2
|bgcolor="#efe146"|2
|19.8
|1
|10.9
|0
|11.4
|1
|1.8
|0
|13.8
|0
|4
|-
|align="left"|Lower Deeside
|15.3
|0
|23.8
|1
|bgcolor="#add8e6"|30.1
|bgcolor="#add8e6"|1
|4.6
|0
|21.7
|1
|4.5
|0
|3
|-
|align="left"|Hazlehead/Queens Cross/Countesswells
|18.4
|1
|6.3
|0
|25.4
|1
|bgcolor="#ffa500"|25.4
|bgcolor="#ffa500"|1
|20.9
|1
|3.6
|0
|4
|-
|align="left"|Airyhall/Broomhill/Garthdee
|27.5
|1
|10.7
|0
|21.1
|1
|bgcolor="#ffa500"|36.5
|bgcolor="#ffa500"|1
|colspan="2" 
|4.2
|0
|3
|-
|align="left"|Torry/Ferryhill
|bgcolor="#efe146"|39.8
|bgcolor="#efe146"|2
|17.3
|1
|19.4
|1
|6.4
|0
|6.3
|0
|10.8
|0
|4
|-
|align="left"|Kincorth/Nigg/Cove
|bgcolor="#efe146"|45.7
|bgcolor="#efe146"|2
|18.8
|1
|21.1
|1
|6.5
|0
|colspan="2" 
|7.7
|0
|4
|- class="unsortable" class="sortbottom"
!align="left"|Total
!35.0
!20
!17.5
!11
!21.6
!8
!14.0
!4
!5.3
!2
!6.3
!0
!45
|}

Ward results

Dyce/Bucksburn/Danestone
The SNP (2), Labour (1) and the Conservatives (1) retained the seats they had won at the previous election.

Bridge of Don
The SNP (2) and the Conservatives (1) retained the seats they had won at the previous election while Labour gained one seat from an independent.

Kingswells/Sheddocksley/Summerhill
The Liberal Democrats and the SNP retained the seats they had won at the previous election while Labour gained one seat from the Conservatives.

Northfield/Mastrick North
The SNP (2) and Labour (1) retained the seats they won at the previous election.

Hilton/Woodside/Stockethill
The SNP retained the seat they won at the previous election and gained one seat from the Conservatives while Labour retained their only seat.

Tillydrone/Seaton/Old Aberdeen
The SNP (2) and Labour (1) retained the seats they won at the previous election.

Midstocket/Rosemount
The SNP, Labour and the Conservatives retained the seats they won at the previous election.

George Street/Harbour
The SNP (2) and Labour (1) retained the seats they won at the previous election while the Liberal Democrats gained a seat from the Conservatives.

Lower Deeside
Labour, the Conservatives and independent candidate Marie Boulton retained the seats they won at the previous election.

Hazlehead/Queens Cross/Countesswells
The Liberal Democrats retained one of their two seats and lost one to independent candidate Jennifer Stewart, while the Conservatives and the SNP retained the seats they won at the previous election. Stewart was elected as a Liberal Democrat councillor in 2017 but subsequently left her party to join the minority Conservative-Aberdeen Labour administration.

Airyhall/Broomhill/Garthdee
The Conservatives, the Liberal Democrats and the SNP retained the seats they won at the previous election.

Torry/Ferryhill
The SNP (2), Labour (1) and the Conservatives (1) retained the seats they had won at the previous election.

Kincorth/Nigg/Cove
The SNP (2), Labour (1) and the Conservatives (1) retained the seats they won at the previous election/

Aftermath
On 18 May, a Partnership was formed between the SNP group and the four Liberal Democrat councillors. David Cameron was made Provost, defeating Labour's Lynn Thomson by 25 votes to 9. The SNP's Alex Nicoll and the Liberal Democrats' Ian Yuill were named Co-Leaders of the Council.

By-elections since 2022

References

2022
Aberdeen City
21st century in Aberdeen